Sheepbridge and Brimington railway station was on the outskirts of the town of Chesterfield, Derbyshire.

The station was on the Great Central Chesterfield Loop which ran between Staveley Central and Heath Junction (just north of Heath railway station) on the Great Central Main Line. The station opened on 4 June 1892, was renamed to Brimington on 18 June 1951 and closed on 2 January 1956.

References

 

Disused railway stations in Derbyshire
Former Great Central Railway stations
Railway stations in Great Britain opened in 1892
Railway stations in Great Britain closed in 1956
Buildings and structures in Chesterfield, Derbyshire